Claudia Hoffmann (born 10 December 1982 in Nauen) is a German sprinter who specialises in the 400 metres. She represents SC Potsdam and trains under Frank Möller.

Her personal best time is 51.65 seconds, achieved in June 2010 in Regensburg.

Achievements

References 
 

1982 births
Living people
People from Havelland
German female sprinters
German national athletics champions
Athletes (track and field) at the 2004 Summer Olympics
Athletes (track and field) at the 2008 Summer Olympics
Olympic athletes of Germany
European Athletics Championships medalists
Olympic female sprinters
Sportspeople from Brandenburg
21st-century German women